Hypercompe tenebra is a moth of the family Erebidae first described by William Schaus in 1894. It is found in Mexico.

References

Hypercompe
Moths described in 1894